Necromanis ("extinct pangolin") is an extinct genus of pangolin from superfamily Manoidea. It lived during the Oligocene and Miocene of Europe. It was originally placed within family Manidae, but was eventually removed from it as more fossil pholidotids from outside that family were found and studied more extensively (i.e., with the discovery and study of Eomanis and Patriomanis). Currently, Necromanis is placed as incertae sedis within the pholidotid superfamily Manoidea, together with the families Manidae and Patriomanidae.

N. quercyi was originally placed within Teutomanis by Ameghino in 1905, but was later subsumed into Necromanis. A new fossil humerus attributed to N. franconica from Quercy, France lead researchers to reaffirm Teutomanis quercyis status as distinct from Necromanis.

Taxonomy
 Genus: †Necromanis''' †Necromanis franconica (Quenstedt, 1886)
 †Necromanis parva (Koenigswald, 1969)
 †Necromanis quercyi (Filhol, 1893)

 Phylogeny 
Phylogenetic position of genus Necromanis'' within superfamily Manoidea.

References 

Mammal enigmatic taxa
Prehistoric pangolins
Oligocene mammals
Miocene mammals of Europe
Myrmecophagous mammals
Prehistoric placental genera
Fossils of France
Fossil taxa described in 1893